The 1996–97 Asian Club Championship was the 16th edition of the annual international club football competition held in the AFC region (Asia). It determined that year's club champion of association football in Asia.

Pohang Steelers of South Korea won the final and became Asian champions for the first time after beating Cheonan Ilhwa Chunma in the first ever Asian top club tournament that ended in a one-country final.

First round

West Asia

|}
1 Al-Sharjah withdrew.

East Asia

|}
1 The 2nd leg was cancelled due to political violence in Sri Lanka. 
2 GD Artilheiros withdrew.

Second round

West Asia

|}

East Asia

|}

Quarterfinals

West Asia

East Asia

Semifinals

Third place match

Final

Awards

References

Asian Club Competitions 1997 at RSSSF.com

1996 in Asian football
1997 in Asian football
1996-97